This is a list of named summits in the nine-county San Francisco Bay Area that are more than  above sea level.  Note that there are no natural features above  in the city of San Francisco.

Unless otherwise referenced, all data are from the Geographic Names Information System (GNIS).  GNIS elevations are imprecise.

Notes

References

 GNIS query form

See also

List of highest points in California by county
List of hills in San Francisco
List of mountain peaks of California

Summits in the San Francisco Bay Area
San Francisco Bay Area
 
Summits